Marka is a Manding language of West Africa, spoken in north-west Burkina Faso.

References

Manding languages
Languages of Burkina Faso